Dante Lam Chiu-Yin is a Hong Kong film director, writer and actor who is a major figure in Chinese action cinema.

Background
He was trained in the tradition of John Woo as an assistant director and worked as an actor and producer. He often writes and supervises his own choreography. In 2008 he won the Hong Kong Film Award for Best Director for his work on Beast Stalker.

His 2018 film Operation Red Sea is the second-highest-grossing Chinese film of all time and 9th in the international box office list of 2018. It won him the Hundred Flowers Award for Best Director and the award for Best Action Choreography at the 38th Hong Kong Film Awards.

In the aftermath of the 2019–20 Hong Kong protests, Lam was contracted by the Hong Kong Police Force (HKPF) to produce a video, Guarding Our City, intended to help rehabilitate the police force's public image. The 15-minute video was released on 23 January 2021.

Filmography

Director
 Option Zero (1997)
 Beast Cops (1998)
 When I Look Upon the Stars (1999)
 Jiang hu: The Triad Zone (2000)
 Runaway (2001)
 Hit Team (2001)
 Tiramisu (2002)
 The Twins Effect (2003)
 Naked Ambition (2003)
 Love on the Rocks (2004)
 Heat Team (2004)
 Undercover Hidden Dragon (2006)
 Sparkling Red Star (2007)
 The Sniper (2008)
 Beast Stalker (2008)
 Storm Rider Clash of the Evils (2008)
 Fire of Conscience (2010)
 The Stool Pigeon (2010)
 The Viral Factor (2011)
 Unbeatable (2013)
 That Demon Within (2014)
 To the Fore (2015)
 Operation Mekong (2016)
 Operation Red Sea (2018)
The Rescue
 Guarding Our City (2021)
 The Battle at Lake Changjin (2021)
 The Battle at Lake Changjin II (2022)
 Bursting Point (2023)
 Operation Red Sea 2 (2024) ''

References

External links 
 

1965 births
Living people
Hong Kong male film actors
Hong Kong film directors
Hong Kong film producers
Hong Kong screenwriters
Hong Kong male television actors
20th-century Hong Kong male actors
Action film directors